Raymond "Ray" Tabern (13 October 1953) is a rugby union, and professional rugby league footballer who played in the 1970s and 1980s.

Background
Ray Tabern's birth was registered in St Helens, Lancashire, England.

Playing career

International honours
Ray Tabern won a cap as an interchange/substitute while at Leigh in Great Britain's 7-8 defeat by France in the friendly at Stadio Pier Luigi Penzo, Venice on Saturday 31 July 1982.

County Cup Final appearances
Ray Tabern played  and was man of the match in Leigh's 8-3 victory over Widnes in the 1981 Lancashire County Cup Final during the 1981–82 season at Central Park, Wigan on Saturday 26 September 1981.

References

External links
!Great Britain Statistics at englandrl.co.uk (statistics currently missing due to not having appeared for both Great Britain, and England)
Statistics at espn.co.uk (RU)

1953 births
Living people
English rugby league players
English rugby union players
Great Britain national rugby league team players
Leigh Leopards players
London Broncos players
Rugby league hookers
Rugby league players from St Helens, Merseyside
Rugby union hookers
Rugby union players from St Helens, Merseyside
Workington Town players